Denduluru Assembly constituency is a constituency representing Andhra Pradesh Legislative Assembly in India. It belongs to Eluru district of Andhra Pradesh and one of the seven assembly segments of Eluru (Lok Sabha constituency). Abbaya Chowdary Kotari is the present MLA of the constituency, who won the 2019 Andhra Pradesh Legislative Assembly election from YSR Congress Party. , there are a total of 220,274 electors in the constituency.

Mandals 

The mandals that form the assembly constituency are:

 Pedavegi, Pedapadu, Denduluru and Eluru mandal (part) mandals Malkapuram, Chataparru, Jalipudi, Katlampudi, Madepalli, Manuru, Sreeparru and Kalakurru villages

Members of Legislative Assembly

Election Results

Assembly elections 2004

Assembly elections 2009

Assembly elections 2014

Assembly elections 2019

See also 
 List of constituencies of Andhra Pradesh Legislative Assembly

References 

Assembly constituencies of Andhra Pradesh